Garrett Davis (September 10, 1801 – September 22, 1872) was a U.S. Senator and Representative from Kentucky.

Early life
Born in Mount Sterling, Kentucky, Garrett Davis was the brother of Amos Davis. After completing preparatory studies, Davis was employed in the office of the county clerk of Montgomery County, Kentucky, and afterward of Bourbon County, Kentucky. He studied law, and, after being admitted to the bar in 1823, pursued the private practice of law in Paris, Kentucky. He owned slaves.

Political career
Davis served in the Kentucky House of Representatives from 1833 to 1835. Afterward, he was elected as a Whig to the United States House of Representatives, serving from March 4, 1839, to March 3, 1847. There he was chairman of the Committee on Territories.

Davis declined to be a candidate for reelection in 1846, but instead resumed the practice of law and also engaged in agricultural pursuits. He refused to reenter politics the next fifteen years. Davis declined the nomination for Lieutenant Governor of Kentucky in 1848 and declined the American Party nomination for Governor in 1855 and for the presidency in 1856.

Davis was opposed to secession, however, and supported the Constitutional Union Party ticket of John Bell and Edward Everett in the 1860 presidential election. This convinced him to reenter politics, and he was elected to the U.S. Senate as a Unionist by the Kentucky General Assembly in a December 1861 special election to fill the vacancy caused by the expulsion of John C. Breckinridge for supporting the Confederacy. He was reelected as a Democrat in 1867. At the time of his death he was chairman of the Committee on Private Land Claims (during the 42nd Congress).

Personal life
Davis was married twice, first to Rebecca Trimble, the daughter of Associate Justice Robert Trimble, and then to Eliza J. Elliott. He was the father of four children: Rebecca, Robert, Carrie and Garrett.

Death and legacy
Davis died in office on September 22, 1872. He is interred at Paris Cemetery, Paris, Kentucky. Davis' home, called Woodhome, was afterward sold to George Edgar who used it for a military academy.

Davis is the namesake of Davis County, Iowa.

See also
List of United States Congress members who died in office (1790–1899)

References

Sources
 
 American National Biography, Dictionary of American Biography, United States Congress.
 Memorial Addresses for Garrett Davis. 42nd Cong., 3rd sess. from 1872 to 1873. Washington, D.C.: Government Printing Office, 1873

1801 births
1872 deaths
People from Mount Sterling, Kentucky
Whig Party members of the United States House of Representatives from Kentucky
Kentucky Constitutional Unionists
Unionist Party United States senators from Kentucky
Democratic Party United States senators from Kentucky
Democratic Party members of the Kentucky House of Representatives
Democratic Party Kentucky state senators
Kentucky lawyers
American slave owners
19th-century American lawyers
United States senators who owned slaves